Dexter Alexander Davis (born November 10, 1986) is a former American football defensive end in the National Football League (NFL) and Canadian Football League (CFL). He was drafted by the Seattle Seahawks in the seventh round of the 2010 NFL Draft. He played college football at Arizona State.

College career
Davis attended Arizona State University. Throughout his career, he started a school record 50 games and finished third on the schools all-time career sack list with 31, behind only Terrell Suggs's 44 and Shante Carver's 41. Along with the 31 sacks he had 136 tackles and 10 forced fumbles.

Professional career

Seattle Seahawks
Davis was drafted by the Seattle Seahawks in the seventh round of the 2010 NFL Draft (236th overall), and the Seahawks announced on June 19, 2010, he had been signed. He recorded a sack in the Seahawks' first pre-season game of the 2010 season against the Tennessee Titans on August 14, 2010, along with another sack that forced a fumble, which Davis also recovered, the following week against Green Bay.

Davis was waived/injured on August 20, 2012, and subsequently reverted to injured reserve on August 22. On April 17, 2013 Davis was waived by the Seahawks making him a free agent.

Toronto Argonauts
On June 6, 2014, Davis signed with the Toronto Argonauts of the Canadian Football League.

On June 11, 2015, the Argonauts announced the retirement of Davis.

References

External links
Seattle Seahawks bio
Toronto Argonauts bio 
Arizona State Sun Devils bio

1986 births
Living people
American football defensive ends
American football linebackers
African-American players of American football
African-American players of Canadian football
Arizona State Sun Devils football players
Canadian football defensive linemen
Players of American football from Phoenix, Arizona
Seattle Seahawks players
Sportspeople from Phoenix, Arizona
Toronto Argonauts players
21st-century African-American sportspeople
20th-century African-American people